Don't Look Down is the fifth album by American country rock band The Ozark Mountain Daredevils. The band lost another founding member, Buddy Brayfield, gained a new producer David Kershenbaum, and added three new players, including singer/guitarist and longtime pal Steve Canaday, who as owner of the New Bijou had been instrumental in the group's formation. Despite containing "Following The Way That I Feel", one of the strongest pop tunes in their catalogue, Don't Look Down didn't meet sales expectations, and presaged the Ozark Mountain Daredevils' move from A&M Records to Columbia Records.

The album is mentioned in the book Barrel Fever, by David Sedaris, in "Don's Story".

Track listing
"River To The Sun" (Steve Cash, John Dillon)-3:25
"Crazy Lovin'" (Steve Cash, John Dillon)-3:53
"Giving It All To The Wind" (Larry Lee)-4:13
"The Fox" (Steve Cash)-2:45
"Backroads" (Steve Canaday)-3:13
"Snowbound" (Steve Cash, John Dillon)-3:30
"Following The Way That I Feel" (Larry Lee)-3:35
"Love Makes The Lover" (John Dillon, Steve Cash)-3:21
"True Believer" (Larry Lee, Steve Cash)-4:13
"Moon On The Rise" (Larry Lee, Steve Cash)-3:05
"Stinghead" (Michael Granda)-2:09
"Sweetwood"*
"Plainity"*
"Valencia Road"*
*Bonus tracks found only on the New Era Productions CD release.

Charts

Personnel
Larry Lee - Drums, acoustic guitar, synthesizer and vocals
Steve Cash - Harp, percussion and vocals
John Dillon - Guitars, fiddle, piano on "Crazy Lovin'" and vocals
Michael "Supe" Granda - Bass, acoustic guitar and vocals
Steve Canaday - Guitar, drums and vocals
Jerry Mills - Mandolin
Rune Walle - Guitars, sitar, banjo and vocals on "Stinghead"
Ruell Chappell - Keyboards and vocals

Geoff Richardson - Viola on "Giving It All To The Wind."
Geoffrey Richardson appears courtesy of Arista Records.

Production
Recorded at Caribou Ranch, Colorado.
Mixed at AIR, London
Engineered by Pete Henderson
Assisted by Tom Likes and Nigel Walker.
Road Manager: Charlie McCall.
Equipment: Larry Tucker and Dick Trask.
Lights and Stage Production: Dan Mayoand Rick Redford.
Artist Management: Good Karma Productions, Kansas City, Missouri.
Art Direction: Roland Young.
Designers: Brian Hagiwara, Stan Evanson.
Cover Photography: Mark Hanauer.
Inner-sleeve Photography: Jim McCrary.

References

The Ozark Mountain Daredevils albums
1978 albums
Albums produced by David Kershenbaum
A&M Records albums